Pavlof Sister is a stratovolcano on the Alaska Peninsula. It is a satellite peak of Pavlof Volcano, lying directly northeast. The mountain was named by the USGS in 1929. It is considered dormant, as the volcano was reported to have last erupted between 1762 and 1786 although the event is questionable. The Alaska Volcano Observatory has the volcano alert level of Pavlof Sister set to "Unassigned", meaning the volcano is not currently monitored.

References

Sources
 
 Volcanoes of the Alaska Peninsula and Aleutian Islands-Selected Photographs
 Alaska Volcano Observatory

Volcanoes of Aleutians East Borough, Alaska
Mountains of Aleutians East Borough, Alaska
Stratovolcanoes of the United States
Mountains of Alaska
Volcanoes of Alaska
Aleutian Range